The Copa América or CONMEBOL Copa América, known until 1975 as the South American Football Championship (Campeonato Sudamericano de Fútbol in Spanish and Campeonato Sul-Americano de Futebol in Portuguese), is the top men's football tournament contested among national teams from South America. It is the oldest still-running continental football competition, as well as the third most watched in the world. The competition determines the champions of South America. Since the 1990s, teams from North America and Asia have also been invited to compete.

Since 1993, the tournament has generally featured 12 teams—all 10 CONMEBOL teams and two additional teams from other confederations. Mexico participated in every tournament between 1993 and 2016, with one additional team drawn from CONCACAF, except for 1999, when AFC team Japan filled out the 12-team roster, and 2019, which featured Japan and Qatar. The 2016 version of the event, Copa América Centenario, featured 16 teams, with six teams from CONCACAF in addition to the 10 from CONMEBOL. Mexico's two runner-up finishes are the highest for a non-CONMEBOL side.

Eight of the ten CONMEBOL national teams have won the tournament at least once in its 47 stagings since the event's inauguration in 1916, with only Ecuador and Venezuela yet to win. Argentina and Uruguay have the most championships in the tournament's history, with 15 cups each. Argentina, which hosted the inaugural edition in 1916, has hosted the tournament the most times (nine). The United States is the only non-CONMEBOL country to host the event, having done so in 2016. On three occasions (in 1975, 1979, and 1983), the tournament was held in multiple South American countries.

History

Beginnings

The first football team in South America, Lima Cricket and Football Club, was established in Peru in 1859, and the Argentine Football Association was founded in 1893. By the early 20th century, football was growing in popularity, and the first international competition held among national teams of the continent occurred in 1910 when Argentina organized an event to commemorate the centenary of the May Revolution. Chile and Uruguay participated, but this event is not considered official by CONMEBOL. Similarly, for the centennial celebration of its independence, Argentina held a tournament between 2 and 17 July 1916 with Argentina, Chile, Uruguay and Brazil being the first participants of the tournament. This so-called Campeonato Sudamericano de Football would be the first edition of what is currently known as Copa América; Uruguay would triumph in this first edition after tying 0–0 with hosts Argentina in the deciding, last match held in Estadio Racing Club in Avellaneda.

Seeing the success of the tournament, a boardmember of the Uruguayan Football Association, Héctor Rivadavia, proposed the establishment of a confederation of the associations of Argentina, Brazil, Chile and Uruguay, and on 9 July, independence day in Argentina, CONMEBOL was founded. The following year, the competition was played again, this time in Uruguay. Uruguay would win the title again to win their bicampeonato after defeating Argentina 1–0 in the last match of the tournament. The success of the tournament on Charrúan soil would help consolidate the tournament. 

After a flu outbreak in Rio de Janeiro canceled the tournament in 1918, Brazil hosted the tournament in 1919 and was crowned champion for the first time after defeating the defending champions 1–0 in a playoff match to decide the title, while the Chilean city of Viña del Mar would host the 1920 event which was won by Uruguay.

For the 1921 event, Paraguay participated for the first time after its football association affiliated to CONMEBOL earlier that same year. Argentina won the competition for the first time thanks to the goals of Julio Libonatti. In subsequent years, Uruguay would dominate the tournament, which at that time was the largest football tournament in the world. Argentina, however, would not be far behind and disputed the supremacy with the Charruas. After losing the 1928 final at the 1928 Summer Olympics held in Amsterdam, Argentina would gain revenge in the 1929 South American Championship by defeating the Uruguayans in the last, decisive match. During this period, both Bolivia and Peru debuted in the tournament in 1926 and 1927, respectively.

Disorganization and intermittency
After the first World Cup held in Uruguay in 1930, the enmity between the football federations of Uruguay and Argentina prevented the competition from being played for a number of years. Only in 1935 was it possible to dispute a special edition of the event to be officially reinstated in 1939. Peru became the host nation of the 1939 edition and won the competition for the first time. Ecuador made their debut at that tournament.

In 1941, Chile hosted that year's edition in celebration of the 400th anniversary of the founding of Santiago for which the capacity of the newly built Estadio Nacional was expanded from 30,000 to 70,000 spectators. Despite the large investment and initial success of the team, the Chileans would be defeated in the last match by eventual champions Argentina. Uruguay hosted and won the 1942 edition. Chile would host again in 1945, and came close to playing for the title against Argentina.  However, Brazil spoiled that possibility, and Argentina would win the tournament once again on Chilean soil.

The event then entered a period of great disruption. The championship was not played on a regular basis and many editions would be deemed unofficial, only to be considered valid later on by CONMEBOL. For example, Argentina would be the first (and so far only) team to win three consecutive titles by winning the championships of 1945, 1946 and 1947. After those three annual tournaments, the competition returned to being held every two years, then three and later four. There were even two tournaments held in 1959, one in Argentina and a second in Ecuador. During this period, some of the national teams were indifferent to the tournament. Some did not participate every year, others sent lesser teams; in the 1959 edition held in Ecuador, Brazil entered a team from the state of Pernambuco. Bolivia won for the first time when it hosted in 1963, but was defeated in the first game of the 1967 tournament by debutant Venezuela. The founding of the Copa Libertadores in 1959 also affected the way the tournament was viewed by its participants.

After eight years of absence, the event resumed in 1975 and officially acquired the name Copa América. The tournament had no fixed venue, and all matches were played throughout the year in each country. Nine teams participated in the group stages with the defending champions receiving a bye into the semifinals. The tournament was contested every four years using this system until 1987.

Renewal

In 1986, CONMEBOL decided to return to having one country host the tournament and to contest it every other year. From 1987 until 2001, the event was hosted every two years in rotation by the ten members of the confederation. The format would remain constant with a first round of groups, but the final round stage ranged from being a new, final round-robin group or a single-elimination system to decide the winner. This renewal helped the tournament, which began to receive television coverage in Europe and North America. The 1987 Copa América was held in Argentina; this was the first time the nation had hosted an edition in 28 years. Despite entering as heavy favorites for being the reigning world champions (having won the 1986 FIFA World Cup), playing at home and having a team largely composed of its World Cup winners led by the legendary Diego Maradona, Argentina would finish in a disappointing fourth place after being beaten by defending champions Uruguay 0–1 in the semifinals. Uruguay would defeat a surprisingly strong Chilean squad who made it to the final, disposing of the powerful Brazil 4–0 on the group stage.

Brazil lifted its first official international title since the 1970 FIFA World Cup upon winning the 1989 Copa América held on home soil. Argentina, in turn, won the Copa América after 32 long years in 1991 in Chile, thanks to a refreshed squad led by the prolific goalscorer Gabriel Batistuta. The 1993 Copa América tournament in Ecuador would take its current form. Along with the usual ten teams, CONMEBOL invited two countries from CONCACAF to participate, Mexico and the United States.

Uruguay managed to win the competition in 1995 as host, ending a period of decline for Uruguayan football. With the implementation of rotating hosts, Colombia, Paraguay and Venezuela hosted the tournament for the first time. Brazil entered a series of victories, winning four of the five continental titles between 1997 and 2007. The first, in 1997, was won after defeating host nation Bolivia 1–3 with goals from Leonardo, Denílson and Ronaldo becoming crucial in the Verde-Amarelas consagration on Bolivia's altitude. Brazil would successfully defend the title in 1999 after thumping Uruguay 3–0 in Asuncion, Paraguay. However, the 2001 Copa América saw one of the biggest surprises of the history of the sport as Honduras eliminated Brazil in the quarterfinals. Colombia, the host nation, would go on to win the competition for the first time ever.

From 2001 to 2007, the tournament was contested every three years, and from 2007 forward every four years, with the exception of the tournament's centennial in 2016.

Running from an embarrassing performance in 2001, Brazil reestablished itself in the South American pantheon after defeating Argentina, on penalties, in order to win the 2004 competition held in Peru. Three years later, the two teams met again in the final, this time in Venezuela. Once again, Brazil came out victorious after crushing Argentina 3–0.

Argentina hosted the 2011 competition and was ousted by Uruguay in the quarterfinals by penalty shootout. Uruguay would go on defeating Peru 2–0 in the semis to reach the finals and overpower Paraguay 3–0, thus winning the trophy on Argentinean soil for the third time and second in a row. This, the 43rd edition, was the first time that neither Argentina nor Brazil reached the semifinals of a tournament they both had entered.

The 2015 competition was hosted in Chile, who swapped hosting positions with Brazil in light of the latter's hosting of the 2014 FIFA World Cup and 2016 Summer Olympics. Chile went on to win the tournament, their first title, on home soil.

In 2016, the centenary of the tournament was celebrated with the Copa América Centenario tournament hosted in the United States; the tournament was the first to be hosted outside of South America and had an expanded field of 16 teams from CONMEBOL and CONCACAF. During the tournament, media outlets reported that CONMEBOL and CONCACAF were negotiating a merger of the Copa América with the CONCACAF Gold Cup, the latter's continental tournament held every 2 years, with the United States hosting regular tournaments; United States Soccer Federation president Sunil Gulati called the report inaccurate, saying that no such discussion had taken place and that a new tournament would have to be established. For the second time, Chile won the trophy.

Hosts

In 1984, CONMEBOL adopted the policy of rotating the right to host the Copa América amongst the ten member confederations. The first rotation was completed following the 2007 Copa América which took place in Venezuela. A second rotation commenced in 2011, with host countries rotating in alphabetical order, starting with Argentina. Chile, Mexico and the United States expressed interest in hosting the next tournament, but the CONMEBOL Executive Committee decided to continue the execution of the rotation, giving priority of the organization to each of its member associations; each association confirms whether they will host an edition or not, having no obligation to do so. Argentina confirmed on 24 November 2008, via representatives of the Argentine Football Association, that it would host the 2011 Copa América.

The 2015 Copa América was due to be held in Brazil following the order of rotation. However, as Brazil was hosting both the 2014 FIFA World Cup and the 2016 Summer Olympics, the decision was reconsidered. Although CONMEBOL President Nicolas Leoz proposed hosting the continental tournament in Mexico (a member of the CONCACAF federation) and board members Brazil and Chile discussed the possibility of exchanging the 2015 and 2019 tournaments, it was decided and confirmed by the CBF in February 2011 that the 2015 Copa América would remain in Brazil. However, in March 2012, CBF president Ricardo Teixeira resigned from his position and the CBF agreed to swap the tournament's hosting with Chile. The swap was made official in May 2012. The centennial edition of the tournament, Copa América Centenario, took place in June 2016, and was held in the United States. The Copa América Centenario marked the first time the tournament was hosted by a non-CONMEBOL nation.

Each Copa América since 2005 has had its own mascot. Gardelito, the mascot for the 1987 competition, was the first Copa América mascot.
 
C = non-CONMEBOL host.

Format and rules
In most tournaments, the tournament consists of a round-robin stage or a round-robin group stage followed by a single-elimination knockout stage.

The tournament was previously known as Campeonato Sudamericano de Futbol (South American Championship of Football). South American Championship of Nations was the official English language name. The current name has been used since 1975. Up to 1967 if there was a tie of points at the top of the standings, a playoff match (or matches) would be held to determine the champion. Between 1975 and 1983 it had no fixed host nation, and was held in a home and away fashion. The current final tournament features 12 national teams competing over a month in the host nation. There are two phases: the group stage followed by the knockout stage. In the group stage, teams compete within three groups of four teams each. Three teams are seeded, including the hosts, with the other seeded teams selected using a formula based on the FIFA World Rankings. The other teams are assigned to different "pots", usually based also on the FIFA Rankings, and teams in each pot are drawn at random to the three groups.

Each group plays a round-robin tournament, in which each team is scheduled for three matches against other teams in the same group. The last round of matches of each group is not scheduled at the same time unlike many tournaments around the world. The top two teams from each group advance to the knockout stage as well as the two best third-place teams. Points are used to rank the teams within a group. Beginning in 1995, three points have been awarded for a win, one for a draw and none for a loss (before, winners received two points).

The ranking of each team in each group is determined as follows:
a) greatest number of points obtained in all group matches;
b) goal difference in all group matches;
c) greatest number of goals scored in all group matches.

If two or more teams are equal on the basis of the above three criteria,
their rankings are determined as follows:
d) greatest number of points obtained in the group matches between the teams concerned;
e) goal difference resulting from the group matches between the teams concerned;
f) greater number of goals scored in all group matches between the teams concerned;
g) drawing of lots by the CONMEBOL Organizing Committee (i.e. at random).

The knockout stage is a single-elimination tournament in which teams play each other in one-off matches, with penalty shootouts used to decide the winner if a match is still tied after 90 minutes in the quarter-finals and semi-finals, and after extra time in the final. It begins with the quarter-finals, then semi-finals, the third-place match (contested by the losing semi-finalists), and the final.

Invitees
Owing to CONMEBOL's somewhat limited number of registered national football federations, countries from other continents are usually invited to participate to make up the 12 teams necessary for the current tournament format. Since 1993, two teams from other confederations, usually from CONCACAF whose members are geographically and culturally close, have also been invited. In all, nine nations have received invitations: Costa Rica (1997, 2001, 2004, 2011, 2016), Honduras (2001), Japan (1999, 2019), Jamaica (2015, 2016), Mexico (1993, 1995, 1997, 1999, 2001, 2004, 2007, 2011, 2015, 2016), Haiti (2016), Panama (2016), the United States (1993, 1995, 2007, 2016) and Qatar (2019). The United States was invited to every tournament between 1997 and 2007 but frequently turned down the invitation due to scheduling conflicts with Major League Soccer. However, on 30 October 2006, the US Soccer Federation accepted the invitation to participate in the 2007 tournament, ending a 12-year absence. At the 2001 Copa América, Canada was an invitee, but withdrew just before the start of the tournament due to security concerns.

At the 2011 Copa América, Japan withdrew, citing difficulties with European clubs in releasing Japanese players following the Tōhoku earthquake and tsunami. Spain was invited to the 2011 edition, but according to the Royal Spanish Football Federation, they declined because they did not want to interrupt the Spanish players' holidays. At the 2015 Copa América, Japan declined the invitation as it would bring burdens to their overseas players, and China had to withdraw due to the Asian sector of qualification for the 2018 World Cup being held at the same time. At the 2021 Copa América invitees Australia and Qatar on 23 February 2021, announced their withdrawal from the tournament, due to the postponement of the remainder of the AFC Second Round of 2022 FIFA World Cup qualification to June 2021.

Invitees nations record

QF = quarter-final, GS = group stage, 2nd/3rd/4th = final rank
Australia and Qatar were invited to the 2021 edition of the tournament but later withdrew due to scheduling conflict with the FIFA World Cup AFC qualification matches.

Trophies

The Copa América trophy, which is awarded to the winners of the tournament, was donated to the Association by the Ministry of Foreign Affairs of Argentina, Ernesto Bosch, in 1910, when Argentina organized an event to commemorate the centenary of the May Revolution. That competition (also attended by Uruguay and Chile) was named "Copa del Centenario" (Centennial Cup).

The current Copa América trophy was purchased in 1916 from "Casa Escasany", a jewelry shop in Buenos Aires, at the cost of 3,000 Swiss francs.

The plaques are engraved with every winner of the competition, as well as the edition won. The trophy previously had a one- and two-level base , and prior to 1979 there was no base at all, like the one used in 1975.

In April 2016, a commemorative trophy – specifically designed for the Copa América Centenario – was introduced at the Colombian Football Federation headquarters of Bogotá to commemorate the 100th anniversary of the competition. The trophy was based on the original Copa América trophy's shape, added with the 2016 edition logo. The trophy was not to have a base. The emblems of CONMEBOL and CONCACAF were also engraved on its body.

The commemorative Copa América Centenario trophy was designed by Epico Studios in the United States and manufactured by London Workshops of Thomas Lyte in England."Así es el trofeo de la Copa América Centenario", Infobae, 28 April 2016 The winning team will keep the trophy in perpetuity.

Apart from the main trophy, the "Copa Bolivia" (a small trophy made in silver) has been awarded to the runner-up of the competition since the 1997 edition. The trophy is named after the country that hosted the 1997 Copa América, with a small Bolivian flag attached on one of its sides.

Results

Summary

* Indicates host country

Records and statistics

Awards

There are currently five post-tournament awards
 the Best Player for most valuable player, first awarded in 1987;
 the Top Goalscorer for most prolific goal scorer;
 the Best Goalkeeper  for most outstanding goalkeeper,  first awarded in 2011;
 the Team of the Tournament for best combined team of players at the tournament;
 the Fair Play Award''' for the team with the best record of fair play, first awarded in 2011.

 See also 
 Copa América Centenario
 Copa Centenario Revolución de Mayo
 Continental football championships

References

External links

 
 A brief history of the Copa América on The Guardian''
 The Copa América Archive – Trivia
 RSSSF archive – includes extensive match reports.

 
CONMEBOL competitions
Recurring sporting events established in 1916
Quadrennial sporting events
Association football events